Gultoo is a 2018 Indian Kannada language cyber-thriller film written and directed by Janardhan Chikkanna. under the banner Vivid Films, the movie's music is scored by  Amit Anand. Naveen Shankar and Sonu Gowda star along with Rangayana Raghu, Avinash playing the supporting characters. Shanti Sagar is the cinematographer of the film. This was the 4000th movie made in Kannada film industry.

Plot
Alok (Naveen Shankar) an orphan becomes famous in his college by hacking an online movie booking website and make his seniors watch a movie which was a task during the Ragging session. After college he and his friend Aasthi (Ram Dhanush) stay together where Alok works as a Computer Science trainer in a Computer Institute where he falls in love with Pooja (Sonu Gowda). Pooja is later revealed as an undercover officer of Indian Intelligence Bureau. Later with the help of Phaneesh (Pawan Kumar) a techie, she tries to pin Alok, who turns out to be the prime suspect in the theft of the Sudhar data from the storage centre.

Cast
 Naveen Shankar as Alok
 Sonu Gowda as Pooja Ramesh/Anagha
 Avinash as Circle Inspector Avinash
 Rangayana Raghu as Chief Minister Anantharamaiah
 Pawan Kumar  as Techie Phaneesh
 Pradeep Doddaiah as lecturer 
 Ram Dhanush as Arasiah Thimmappa alias Aasthi

Production

Casting and filming 
Naveen Shankar's entry into Gultoo was through association with college batchmate and director Janardhan Chikkanna.

Marketing 
“The director has come out with different posters too, which go well with the title and subject of Gultoo. There was a producer-pitch trailer, in which every actor wore glasses with round frames, and this became a highlight".

Soundtrack

Amit Anand has composed the score and songs for the film. The lyrics for the songs are written by Jayanth Kaikini, Kiran Kaverappa and Anoop Ramaswamy Kashyap.

Critical response 
The film opened to positive reviews from critics upon theatrical release. Writing for The News Minute, Rakesh says “It comes as a bit of a surprise to see Sandalwood pick up on the topic of Aadhaar and data theft so quickly.” Rating the movie 3.5 out of 5, Sunayana Suresh from The Times of India says “The freshness in the narrative and the extensive research show that director Janardhan Chikkanna is someone to watch out for.” “Gultoo has the elements of a musical-romance and a thriller. But it is spread out in the form of a tragicomedy – a tragicomedy because the viewers are left scratching their heads at the blatant truth staring at them and applauding the makers’ vision at the same time" quoted The First Post. Deccan Chronicle carried the review saying “amidst all sorts of smart ‘leaks’ which has rocked the nation, raising big questions over the safety of all our personal data, here comes a perfect infotainment revolving around one such 'leak’ from another engineer turned director who makes an impressive mark, hacking into a sensible tale in his debut venture.” Prakash from IB Times states that “It is a new-age movie that deals with data theft and exposes the way our data is being mined for money. It tries to showcase how our every single moment is recorded and has a price on the internet. In short, the movie shows how technology can bring misery to our lives but doesn't take a stand whether tech is good or bad.”

References

External links
  
 

2018 films
2010s Kannada-language films
Indian satirical films
Malware in fiction
Techno-thriller films